Verna Arline Felton (July 20, 1890December 14, 1966) was an American actress who provided  voices for numerous Disney animated films.

She also provided the voice for Fred Flintstone's mother-in-law, Pearl Slaghoople in Hanna-Barbera's The Flintstones (1962–1963) and had roles in live-action films.  However, she was most active in radio programs, where her characters were known for their husky voices and no-nonsense attitudes. Two of her most famous roles were as Dennis Day's mother, Mrs. Day on The Jack Benny Program (1939–1962) and as Hilda Crocker on the CBS sitcom December Bride (1952–1959).

Felton's television appearances included The George Burns and Gracie Allen Show, I Love Lucy, Where's Raymond?, Pete and Gladys and Dennis the Menace.

Early years
Verna Arline Felton was born in Salinas, California, on July 20, 1890. Her father, Horace Wilcox Felton, a doctor, died shortly before her ninth birthday. When going over his accounts after his death, Felton's mother Clara Winder Felton (née Lawrence) discovered that although her husband had a large medical practice in San Jose, there were no records of his patients' payments for treatment and no cash in the office.  

Shortly before her father's death, Felton had performed in a local benefit for victims of the Galveston Flood. Her singing and dancing attracted the attention of a manager of a road show company that was playing in San Jose at the time. The manager spoke to Felton's mother, offering to give Felton a job with his company. Since the family was experiencing difficult financial times with the loss of Felton's father, her mother contacted the road show manager. Felton quickly joined the cast of the show, growing up in the theater.

Early career
An August 19, 1900, newspaper advertisement for Fischer's Concert House in San Francisco listed among the performers "Little Verna Felton, the Child Wonder." By 1903, she was acting with the Allen Stock Company, which that year toured the west coast of the United States and performed in Vancouver, British Columbia, Canada. By 1907, she was still with the Allen troupe, but she had progressed from child performer to leading lady. Herbert Bashford wrote a play, The Defiance of Doris, specifically for Felton, and the Allen company included it among the group's productions in 1910.

She acted in stage plays at the Empress Theatre in Vancouver in the late 1920s, playing the lead role in Goldfish, Stella Dallas, and The Second Mrs. Tanqueray. Future husband Lee Millar (1888–1941) directed the band for these plays.

Radio and television

Felton worked extensively in the 1930s and 1950s in radio, notably playing The Mom in The Cinnamon Bear, Junior the Mean Widdle Kid's grandmother on Red Skelton's radio series, Hattie Hirsch on Point Sublime, and Dennis Day's protective, domineering, and  authoritative mother, Mrs. Day, who was always looking out for him while trying to boss around Jack Benny on The Jack Benny Program. In addition, she performed on radio as a regular on The Abbott and Costello Show and The Great Gildersleeve. She played the fairy godmother in re-imaginings of the Cinderella story that were included in episodes of the series Screen Directors Playhouse, and Hallmark Playhouse.

Felton's first television appearance was in a 1951 episode of The Amos 'n Andy Show as a nurse. She appeared in a recurring role as the mother of Ruth Farley, a young woman played by Gloria Winters in the 1953–55 ABC sitcom with a variety show theme, Where's Raymond?, renamed The Ray Bolger Show. The series starred Ray Bolger as Raymond Wallace, a song-and-dance man who was repeatedly barely on time for his performances.

Though some sitcom aficionados might assume that her guest appearances on I Love Lucy led to a regular supporting role as Hilda Crocker on the CBS sitcom December Bride, Felton had played that same character on the radio version two years prior to the television production. December Bride also starred Spring Byington, Dean Miller, Frances Rafferty, and Harry Morgan. Felton continued her Hilda Crocker role on the December Bride spin-off, Pete and Gladys, with Harry Morgan and Cara Williams. For her performance on December Bride, Felton was nominated for the Primetime Emmy Award for Outstanding Supporting Actress in a Comedy Series in 1958 and in 1959.

Felton was the original voice of Fred Flintstone's mother-in-law, Pearl Slaghoople, voicing the character as a semi-regular in seasons two and three of Hanna-Barbera's landmark TV series The Flintstones. Fred's mother-in-law was not named during Felton's run; the "Slaghoople" name was mentioned in season four when Janet Waldo debuted in the role. In 1963, in the series finale of CBS's Dennis the Menace sitcom, Felton played John Wilson's aunt in the episode entitled "Aunt Emma Visits the Wilsons". In the story line, Mr. Wilson (Gale Gordon) tries to convince Aunt Emma to leave her estate to him and his wife, Eloise (Sara Seegar). Wilson becomes suspicious when Emma begins spending time with Dennis Mitchell (Jay North). Felton's son Lee Millar Jr. played Tommy Anderson's father on the same sitcom.

Film and animation
Felton's on-screen appearance was in the 1917 silent film, The Chosen Prince, or the  Friendship of David and Jonathan. During the 1940s and the early 1950s, she was in demand as a character actress on films, with roles in If I Had My Way (1940), Girls of the Big House (1945), The Fuller Brush Man (1948), Buccaneer's Girl (1950), Belles on Their Toes (1952), Don't Bother to Knock (1952), and her memorable role as Mrs. Potts warmly acting as surrogate mother to William Holden in the 1955 film adaptation of William Inge's stage play Picnic.

Felton was a popular actress at the Walt Disney Studios, lending her voice to the animated features:
Dumbo (1941) as the Elephant Matriarch and Mrs. Jumbo, Dumbo's Mother
Cinderella (1950) as The Fairy Godmother 
Alice in Wonderland (1951) as the Queen of Hearts
Lady and the Tramp (1955) as Aunt Sarah, Jim Dear's aunt (Felton's son voiced Jim Dear and the dogcatcher)
Sleeping Beauty (1959) as Flora, the Red Fairy and Queen Leah, Princess Aurora's mother
Goliath II (1960) as Eloise the Elephant
The Jungle Book (1967) as Winifred the Elephant (her final role, animated or live-action)

According to the Los Angeles Times, Felton served as Honorary Mayor of North Hollywood for several years.

Death
Felton died at her home of a stroke at the age of 76 in the evening of December 14, 1966, one day before Walt Disney's passing. She is interred at Grand View Memorial Park Cemetery in Glendale, California.

Filmography

Radio

Film

Television

Discography
 Walt Disney's Cinderella: Little Miller Series (1949, RCA/Camden) - The Fairy Godmother
 Walt Disney's Cinderella (1954, RCA/Camden) - The Fairy Godmother
 Disney Songs and Story: Sleeping Beauty (2012, Walt Disney Records) - Flora / Queen Leah

References

Other sources
Terrace, Vincent. Radio Programs, 1924–84. Jefferson, North Carolina: McFarland, 1999. 
Tucker, Fredrick. Verna Felton. Albany, Georgia: BearManor Media, 2010.

External links
 
 
Portrait gallery (NY Public Library, Billy Rose collection)

1890 births
1966 deaths
20th-century American actresses
Actresses from California
American film actresses
American radio actresses
American television actresses
American voice actresses
Audiobook narrators
Burials at Grand View Memorial Park Cemetery
Disney people
Hanna-Barbera people
People from Salinas, California